
This is a list of Roman cognomina.

A
Abercius, 
Abito,
Abundantius,
Abundius,
Abundus,
Aburianus,
Acacius, 
Acaunus, 
Acceptus,
Achaicus, 
Acidinus,
Acilianus, 
Aculeo,
Acutianus,
Acutus,
Adauctus, 
Adelphius, 
Adiutor, 
Adranos, 
Adventus, 
Aeacus, 
Aebutus, 
Aedesius,
Aelianus,
Aemilianus, 
Aeserninus,
Aetius,
Afer, 
Africanus,
Afrinus,
Agaptus, 
Agatopus, 
Agelastus, 
Agorix, 
Agricola, 
Agrippa, 
Agrippianus,
Agrippinillus,
Agrippinus, 
Ahala, 
Ahenobarbus, 
Albanianus,
Albanus, 
Albillus,
Albinianus,
Albinius, 
Albinus, 
Albucillus,
Albucius, 
Albus,
Alcimus,
Alethius, 
Alienus,
Allectus, 
Aluredes, 
Alypius, 
Amabilis,
Amandianus,
Amandinus,
Amandus, 
Amantillus,
Amantius,
Amarantus,
Amator, 
Amatus,
Ambrosius, 
Ambustus (associated with gens Fabia), 
Amor, 
Amphion, 
Ampliatus,
Anatolius, 
Andronicus, 
Angelus, 
Annaeanus,
Annianus,
Anniolus,
Antias,
Antius, 
Antiquus,
Antistianus,
Antonianus,
Antonillus,
Antoninus,
Anulinus,
Anullinus, 
Apelles, 
Apellinus, 
Aper, 
Apollinaris,
Apollonarius,
Apollonius, 
Appianillus,
Appianus,
Appuleianus,
Aprilis,
Aprillus,
Aprinus,
Apronianus,
Apronillus,
Apuleianus,
Aquila, 
Aquilianus,
Aquilinus,
Aquillianus,
Arator, 
Aratus, 
Arcadius,
Arcanus, 
Arcavius, 
Archarius, 
Arius, 
Armiger, 
Arminus, 
Arnobius,
Arpagius, 
Arrianus, 
Arruntianus,
Arruntius, 
Artorianus, 
Arulenus,
Arvina, 
Asellio, 
Asellus,
Asiaticus,
Asina, 
Asinianus,
Asper,
Asprenas, 
Asprenus, 
Assanius, 
Atianus,
Atilianus,
Atratinus,
Attianus,
Attianillus,
Atticianus,
Atticillus,
Atticinus,
Atticus,
Attilianus,
Auctillus,
Auctus,
Audaios, 
Audax,
Audens, 
Aufidianus,
Augendus, 
Augur,
Augurinus, 
Augurius, 
Augustalis, 
Augustanus, 
Augustinus,
Augustus,
Aurelianus, 
Aurelius, 
Aureolus,
Aurunculeianus,
Auruncus,
Ausonius, 
Auspex,
Auspicatus,
Auxentius, 
Auxientius, 
Auxilius, 
Avienus, 
Aviola,
Avitianus,
Avitillus,
Avitus,
Axilla

B
Baebianus,
Balbillus, 
Balbinus,
Balbus, 
Bambalio, 
Bamballio, 
Banquerius, 
Barba,
Barbarus,
Barbatus, 
Barbillus,
Barbula,
Baro, 
Bassianus,
Bassinus,
Bassus, 
Bato, 
Belenus, 
Belisarius, 
Beatus,
Bellator, 
Bellicianus, 
Bellicus, 
Bellus, 
Benedictus,
Benignus,
Bestia, 
Betto, 
Bibaculus, 
Bibulus,
Bitucus, 
Blaesillus,
Blaesus, 
Blandinus,
Blandus,
Blasius,
Blossianus,
Bodenius, 
Boethius,
Boetius,
Bolanus, 
Bonifatius, 
Bonosus, 
Bonus, 
Bradua,
Briccius,
Bricius,
Briktius,
Britannicus, 
Britius,
Brixius,
Brocchillus,
Brocchus, 
Bromidus, 
Bruccius, 
Brucetus, 
Bruscius,
Bruttianus,
Brutus, 
Bubo, 
Bubulcus,
Buca,
Buccio, 
Bulbus,
Bulla, 
Burcanius, 
Burrus, 
Buteo

C
Caecilianus, 
Caecina, 
Caecinianus,
Caedicianus,
Caelianus,
Caelimontanus (associated with Gens Verginia),
Caelinus,
Caecus, 
Caelestinus,
Caelestius,
Caelianus,
Caelinus,
Caelistis,
Caepio, 
Caerellius, 
Caesar, 
Caesennianus,
Caesianus,
Caesonianus,
Caesoninus,
Caianillus,
Caianus,
Calacicus, 
Calamus,
Calaritanus,
Calatinus, 
Calavianus,
Caldus, 
Calenus, 
Calerus, 
Caletus, 
Calidianus,
Callidianus, 
Callisunus, 
Calogerus,
Calpurnianus, 
Calpurnis, 
Calvinus,
Calvisianus, 
Calvus, 
Camerinus,
Camerius, 
Camillus,
Campanianus, 
Campanus, 
Campester,
Candidianus,
Candidillus,
Candidinus, 
Candidus,
Canianus,
Canidianus,
Canina,
Caninianus,
Cantaber, 
Capella,
Capito,
Capitolinus,
Caprarius,
Capreorus, 
Caracturus, 
Carantus, 
Carbo, 
Carinus,
Carius, 
Carnifex, 
Carus, 
Carvilianus,
Casca, 
Cassianillus,
Cassianus, 
Castinus, 
Castorius, 
Castus, 
Catianus, 
Catilina, 
Cato, 
Catonius,
Cattianus,
Catullinus, 
Catullus, 
Catulus, 
Catus, 
Caudex,
Caudinus,
Celatus, 
Celer, 
Celerianus,
Celerinus,
Celsillus,
Celsinillus,
Celsinus,
Celsus, 
Cenaeus, 
Cencius,
Censor,
Censorinillus, 
Censorinus, 
Censorius, 
Centumalus, 
Cerialis, 
Cerinthus, 
Certinus,
Certus,
Cerularius, 
Cervianus, 
Cervidus, 
Cethegus, 
Chlorus, 
Christianus, 
Cicatricula,
Cicero, 
Cico, 
Cicurinus,
Cicurius,
Cimber, 
Cincinnatus,
Cinna, 
Cinnianus, 
Cita, 
Cittinus, 
Civilis, 
Clarentius,
Clarianus,
Clarus, 
Classicianus,
Classicus, 
Claudianus, 
Claudillus,
Claudus,
Clemens,
Clementianus, 
Clementillus,
Clementinus,
Clodianus, 
Clodus,
Cocceianus,
Cocles,
Coelianus,
Coelinus,
Cogitatus, 
Colias, 
Collatinus,
Colonus, 
Columbanus, 
Columella, 
Coma,
Comes, 
Comitianus, 
Comitinus, 
Commidius, 
Commidus, 
Commius, 
Commodus, 
Concessianus,
Concessus, 
Congrio, 
Constans,
Constantillus,
Constantinus, 
Constantius,
Coranus, 
Corbulo,
Corculum, 
Cordillus,
Cordus, 
Coriolanus,
Cornelianus,
Cornicen,
Cornix, 
Cornutus, 
Corvinus, 
Corvus, 
Cosmas, 
Cossus,
Cotentinus, 
Cotta,
Crassillus, 
Crassus, 
Cremutius,
Crescens,
Crescentianus,
Crescentillus,
Crescentinus,
Crescentius,
Creticus,
Crispianus,
Crispinianus,
Crispinillus, 
Crispinus, 
Crispus, 
Crito, 
Crotilo, 
Crus,
Cucuphas, 
Culleolus, 
Cullio,
Cumanus, 
Cunctator,
Cunobarrus, 
Cupitianus,
Cupitus,
Curianus,
Curio,
Cursor,
Curtianus,
Curvus, 
Cyprianus, 
Cyricus

D
Dacianus, 
Dacicus,
Dacius,
Dalmaticus,
Dalmatius, 
Dama, 
Damascius,
Damasippus, 
Damasus, 
Damianus, 
Dannicus, 
Dardanius, 
Dardanus, 
Dativus,
Datus,
Decianus,
Deciminus, 
Decimus,
Decmitius,
Decoratus,
Densus,
Dentatus,
Denter,
Dento,
Desideratus,
Desiderius,
Dexion, 
Dexippus, 
Dexter,
Dextrianus,
Diadematus,
Dianilla,
Didianus,
Didicus, 
Didymus,
Dido,
Dignillus,
Dignissimus,
Dignus, 
Dio, 
Diocletianus, 
Dioscourides, 
Disertus, 
Dives,
Docilinus, 
Docilus, 
Dolabella, 
Dolens,
Dominicus, 
Domitianus, 
Domitillus,
Donatianus, 
Donatillus,
Donatus, 
Donicus, 
Dorotheus, 
Dorso,
Dorsuo,
Draco, 
Drusillus, 
Drusus, 
Dubitatius, 
Duilianus,
Dulcitius, 
Durio, 
Durus, 
Duvianus

E
Eborius, 
Eburnus, 
Ecdicius, 
Eclectus, 
Efficax,
Egbuttius, 
Egnatianus,
Egnatillus,
Elerius, 
Eliphas, 
Elpidius, 
Elvorix, 
Emeritus, 
Encratis, 
Ennecus, 
Ennodius, 
Eonus, 
Eparchius,
Epidianus, 
Epimachus, 
Epiphanius,
Epolonius, 
Erasinus, 
Esdras, 
Esquilinus,
Equinus,
Etruscillus,
Etruscus,
Eucherius,
Eudomius, 
Eudoxius, 
Eugenius, 
Eugenus, 
Eulogius, 
Eumenius, 
Eunapius, 
Euphemius, 
Eurysaces,
Eustachius,
Eustacius, 
Eustathius,
Eustochius,
Eutherius, 
Evodius, 
Excingus, 
Exoratus,
Exsupereus, 
Extricatus,
Exuperans,
Exuperantius, 
Exuperatus,
Exupereus,
Exuperius

F
Faber,
Fabianus, 
Fabiolus, 
Fabricianus,
Fabullianus,
Fabullus,
Facilis, 
Facundinus,
Facundus,
Fadus, 
Fagus, 
Falco, 
Falconillus, 
Falx, 
Fama,
Familiaris, 
Fastidius,
Farus, 
Fatalis,
Faustillus, 
Faustinianus, 
Faustinus, 
Faustus, 
Faventinus,
Favonianus, 
Favorinus,
Felicianus,
Felicissimus, 
Feliсitas,
Feliсius,
Felissimus, 
Felix, 
Ferentinus, 
Ferox,
Ferreolus, 
Festianus,
Festivus,
Festus, 
Fidelis,
Fidenas,
Fidus, 
Figulus, 
Fimbria, 
Fimus, 
Firmianus,
Firmillus,
Firminianus,
Firminillus,
Firminus, 
Firmus, 
Flaccianus,
Flaccillus,
Flaccinator,
Flaccinus,
Flaccus,
Flamen,
Flaminianus,
Flaminillus,
Flamininus,
Flamma, 
Flavianillus,
Flavianus, 
Flavillus, 
Flavinus,
Flavus,
Florens, 
Florentianus,
Florentillus,
Florentinus,
Florentius, 
Florianus, 
Floridus,
Florillus,
Florinus,
Florus, 
Fonteianus,
Forianus, 
Fortis,
Fortunatianus,
Fortunatus, 
Fraucus, 
Frequens,
Frequentianus,
Frequentillus,
Frequentinus,
Frigidianus, 
Frontalis,
Frontillus,
Frontinianus, 
Frontinus, 
Fronto,
Frontonianus,
Frontonillus,
Fructuosus,
Fructus,
Frugi, 
Frugius, 
Frumentius, 
Fufianus,
Fulgentius,
Fullo,
Fullofaudes,
Fulvianillus, 
Fulvianus, 
Fulvillus,
Fulvus,
Fundanus,
Furianus,
Fuscianillus,
Fuscianus,
Fuscillus,
Fuscinillus,
Fuscinus, 
Fuscus,
Fusus

G
Gabinianus,
Gabinillus,
Gabinus,
Gaetulicus,
Gaianillus,
Gaianus, 
Gala, 
Galarius, 
Galba,
Galenus, 
Galerus, 
Gallicanus,
Gallicus,
Gallienus,
Gallio, 
Gallus, 
Galvisius, 
Garilianus, 
Garrulus,
Gaudens,
Gaudentianus,
Gaudentius,
Gavianus,
Gavros,
Gelasius, 
Gellianus,
Gemellianus, 
Gemellinus,
Gemellus, 
Geminianus, 
Geminus,
Generidus, 
Genesius, 
Genialis, 
Gennadius, 
Gentilis,
Germanicus, 
Germanus,
Jovinianus,
Geta, 
Getha, 
Glabrio, 
Globulus, 
Gluvias, 
Glycia, 
Gordianus, 
Gordio, 
Gorgonius, 
Gracchanus,
Gracchus, 
Gracilis, 
Graecinus,
Granianus,
Granillus,
Gratianus, 
Gratidianus, 
Gratillus,
Gratinianus,
Gratinus,
Gratus,
Grattianus,
Gregorius, 
Grumio,
Gryllus,
Grypus, 
Gualterus,
Gurges,
Graecus

H
Habitus, 
Hadrianus, 
Hardalio, 
Hasta,
Helvianus,
Hemina,
Herculanus,
Herculius, 
Herennianus,
Herennius,
Herenus, 
Herma, 
Hermias,
Hermina, 
Hesychius, 
Hiberus, 
Hibrida,
Hilarianus,
Hilarillus,
Hilarinus,
Hilario, 
Hilaris, 
Hilarius, 
Hilarus,
Hipparchus,
Hirpinius, 
Hirrus, 
Homullus, 
Honoratianus,
Honoratus, 
Honorinus,
Horatianus,
Horatius, 
Hortensianus,
Hortensis, 
Hortensus, 
Hostilianus,
Humilus,
Hybrida

I
Iacomus,
Ianuarius, 
Iavolenus,
Imbrex,
Imperiosus,
Impetratus,
Indaletius, 
Indus, 
Ingeniosus,
Ingenuillis,
Ingenuus, 
Ingenvinus, 
Innocens,
Inregillensis,
Iocundus, 
Iovianus,
Iovinianus, 
Iovinus, 
Iovius,
Irenaeus, 
Isatis, 
Isauricus, 
Isaurus,
Isidorus, 
Ismarus,
Italicus,
Iuba, 
Iucundianus,
Iucundillus,
Iucundinus,
Iucundus,
Iulianus, 
Iulillus,
Iuliolus,
Iulius,
Iulus,
Iuncinus, 
Iuncus, 
Iunianus, 
Iunillus,
Iunior,
Iustianus, 
Iustillus,
Iustinianus, 
Iustinus, 
Iustus, 
Iuvenalis,
Iuvenis,
Iuventianus,
Iuventinus,
Iynx

L
Labienus,
Labeo,
Laberianus,
Lactantius, 
Lactuca,
Lacticinus,
Laeca, 
Laelianus,
Laenas, 
Laetillus,
Laetinianus, 
Laetus,
Laevillus,
Laevinus,
Laevus,
Lamia,
Lanatus,
Larcianus, 
Lartianus,
Largus,
Lateranus, 
Latinus, 
Latro,
Laurentinus,
Laurentius,
Laurinus,
Laurus, 
Leddicus, 
Lentullus, 
Lentulus, 
Leo, 
Leontius, 
Lepidianus,
Lepidillus,
Lepidinus,
Lepidus, 
Lepontus, 
Leporinus,
Lepos, 
Libanius, 
Liberalis, 
Liberius,
Libo, 
Licinianus, 
Licinus,
Ligur, 
Ligus, 
Ligustinus, 
Limetanus, 
Linus, 
Litorius, 
Littera, 
Litumaris, 
Livianus, 
Livigenus, 
Livillus,
Lollianus,
Longillus,
Longinianus,
Longinillus,
Longinus,
Longus,
Lovernianus, 
Lovernius, 
Lucanus, 
Lucianus, 
Lucidus,
Lucifer,
Lucilianus,
Lucillianus,
Lucillus,
Lucinus,
Luciolus,
Lucretianus, 
Luctacus, 
Lucullus, 
Lunaris, 
Luonercus, 
Lupercillus,
Lupercus, 
Lupicinus, 
Lupinus,
Lupulus,
Lupus,
Lurco, 
Lurio, 
Luscinus,
Luscus,
Lusianus,
Lustricus,
Lutatianus,
Lycaeus

M
Maccalus, 
Macer,
Macerinus,
Macrinianus,
Macrinillus,
Macrinus, 
Macro, 
Macrobius, 
Mactator, 
Maecenus, 
Maecianus, 
Magnentius, 
Magnianus,
Magnillus,
Magnus, 
Magunnus, 
Maior,
Maius, 
Malchus, 
Malleolus,
Mallianus,
Mallus, 
Maltinus, 
Maluginensis,
Mamercinus,
Mamercus,
Mamertinus,
Mamilianus,
Mamma,
Mammula,
Mancinus, 
Manilianus,
Manlianus,
Mansuetus, 
Marcallas, 
Marcellianus,
Marcellinus, 
Marcellus, 
Marcialis, 
Marcianus,
Margarita,
Marianillus, 
Marianus,
Marinianus, 
Marinus, 
Maritialis, 
Maritimus, 
Marius, 
Maro, 
Marsallas, 
Marsicus, 
Marsus, 
Marsyas,
Martialis, 
Martianus, 
Martinianus,
Martinus, 
Martius, 
Martyrius, 
Marullinus, 
Marullus, 
Masavo,
Masculus,
Materninus,
Maternus, 
Matho, 
Maturinus,
Maturus,
Mauricius, 
Maurinus,
Mauritius,
Maurus,
Maxentius,
Maximianus,
Maximillianus,
Maximillus,
Maximinus, 
Maximus, 
Medullinus, 
Megellus, 
Meletius,
Melissus,
Melito, 
Melitus, 
Mellitus, 
Melus, 
Meminianus, 
Memmianus, 
Memor, 
Mento,
Mercator, 
Mercurialis, 
Mercurinus, 
Merenda,
Merula, 
Messala, 
Messalinus,
Messianus,
Messor, 
Metellinus,
Metellus, 
Metilianus, 
Metunus, 
Micianus, 
Mico,
Milo,
Milonius, 
Minervalis, 
Minervinus,
Minianus, 
Minicianus, 
Minucianus,
Moderatillus,
Moderatus, 
Modestinus,
Modestus,
Modianus,
Molacus, 
Momus, 
Montanillus,
Montanus, 
Mordanticus, 
Mucianus, 
Mugillanus,
Munatianus,
Muncius, 
Murena, 
Mus, 
Musa, 
Musca,
Musicus, 
Mutilus

N
Nabor, 
Naevianus, 
Naevolus,
Narcissus, 
Narses, 
Nasica, 
Naso, 
Natalianus,
Natalinus, 
Natalis, 
Natalius,
Natta,
Nepos,
Nepotianus,
Naucratius, 
Nazarius, 
Nectaridus, 
Nelius, 
Nemesianus, 
Nemnogenus, 
Neneus, 
Nennius, 
Nepos, 
Nepotillus,
Neptunalis,
Nero, 
Nertomarus, 
Nerva, 
Nicasius, 
Nicetius, 
Nigellus, 
Niger, 
Nigidianus, 
Nigrianus,
Nigrinus, 
Ninnianus,
Niraemius, 
Nobilior,
Noctua,
Nolus, 
Nonianus, 
Norbanianus,
Noricus,
Noster, 
Novanus,
Novation, 
Novellianus,
Novellus, 
Novianus,
Numerianus, 
Nummus,
Numonis

O
Obsequens,
Oceanus,
Ocella, 
Octavillus,
Octobrianus, 
Oculatus,
Ofella,
Olennius, 
Olympicus, 
Opilio, 
Opimianus, 
Opis, 
Oppianicus,
Oppianus,
Optatillus,
Optatus,
Ordius, 
Orestes,
Orestillus,
Orientalis, 
Orientius, 
Orissus, 
Orontius,
Ostorianus,
Otacilianus, 
Otho, 
Ovidus

P
Pacatianus, 
Pacatus,
Pachomius, 
Pacilus,
Pacuvianus, 
Paenula, 
Paetillus,
Paetinus, 
Paetus, 
Palicanus, 
Palma,
Pammachius,
Pamphilius, 
Panaetius, 
Pansa, 
Pantensus, 
Pantera,
Panthera,
Papianus, 
Papinianus, 
Papirianus,
Papus, 
Paratus, 
Pardus,
Parmensis,
Parnesius, 
Pastor, 
Paterculus, 
Paternianus,
Paternus, 
Patiens, 
Patricius, 
Paulinus, 
Paullinus, 
Paullus/Paulus,
Pavo, 
Pelagius, 
Pennus, 
Pera,
Peregrinus, 
Perennis, 
Perpetuus,
Persicus,
Pertacus, 
Pertinax, 
Pervincianus,
Pervincus,
Petasius, 
Peticus,
Petilianus,
Petillianus,
Petro,
Petronax, 
Petronianus, 
Petronillus, 
Petronius,
Petrus, 
Philippus, 
Philo,
Philus,
Photius, 
Picens (associated with gens Herennia),
Pictor, 
Pilatus, 
Pilus, 
Pinarianus,
Pinnus,
Piso, 
Pitio,
Pius, 
Placidianus,
Placidinus,
Placidus,
Plancianus,
Plancinus, 
Plancus,
Planta, 
Plautianus, 
Plautillus,
Plautinus,
Plautis,
Plautus, 
Pleminianus, 
Plinianus,
Plotianus,
Plotillus,
Plotinus,
Plotus,
Pollianus,
Pollienus, 
Pollio, 
Pollus/Polus,
Polybius, 
Pompeianus,
Pompilianus,
Pompolussa, 
Pomponianus, 
Pomponillus,
Pontianus,
Ponticillus,
Ponticus,
Poplicola, 
Porcellus,
Porcianus,
Porcina,
Porcus, 
Porphyrius, 
Posca,
Postumianus, 
Postuminus,
Postumus, 
Potens,
Potentinus,
Potestas,
Potitianus,
Potitus, 
Praenestinus,
Praesens,
Praetextatus,
Praetextus, 
Prilidianus, 
Primanus, 
Primianus,
Primillus,
Primulus, 
Primus, 
Priscianus, 
Priscillianus, 
Priscillus,
Priscinus,
Priscus,
Privatus,
Privernas,
Probatus,
Probianus,
Probillus,
Probinus,
Probus, 
Processus, 
Proceus, 
Proclus,
Proculianus,
Proculinus,
Proculus, 
Procus,
Procyon, 
Promptus,
Prontinus,
Profuturus, 
Propertius, 
Propinquus,
Prosperus,
Protacius, 
Proteus,
Protus, 
Provincialis,
Proximillus,
Proximus, 
Prudens,
Prudentillus,
Publianus, 
Publicianus,
Publicola, 
Publicus, 
Publilianus,
Pudens, 
Pudentianus,
Pudentillus,
Pudentius, 
Pulcher, 
Pulcherius, 
Pulex,
Pullus, 
Pulvillus,
Pupianus,
Pupus,
Purpureo,
Pusinnus, 
Pusio,
Pustula

Q
Quadratillus,
Quadratus,
Quartillus,
Quartinus, 
Quarto, 
Quartus, 
Quietus, 
Quintianus,
Quintilianus, 
Quintillanius, 
Quintillus,
Quintinus,
Quintus,
Quiricus, 
Quirinalis,
Quirinus

R
Rabirianus,
Raeticus,
Ramio, 
Ravilla, 
Rebilus,
Reburrinus,
Reburrus, 
Receptus, 
Rectus, 
Regillensis,
Regillianus,
Regillus, 
Reginus, 
Regulianus,
Regulus, 
Remigius, 
Remus, 
Renatus, 
Repentinus,
Respectillus,
Respectus, 
Restitutus, 
Rex,
Rhesus, 
Ripanus, 
Robustus,
Rogatianus,
Rogatillus,
Rogatus, 
Rogelius, 
Romanillus,
Romanus, 
Romulianus, 
Romulus, 
Roscianus, 
Rufianus,
Rufillus,
Rufinianus, 
Rufinillus,
Rufinus, 
Rufrianus, 
Rufus, 
Ruga,
Rullianus,
Rullus, 
Ruricius,
Rusca, 
Ruso, 
Russus,
Rusticus, 
Rutilianus,
Rutilus

S
Sabaco,
Sabellius,
Sabinianus, 
Sabinillus,
Sabinus, 
Saccus,
Sacerdos, 
Saenus, 
Salinator, 
Sallustianus,
Salonianus, 
Saloninus,
Salvianus, 
Salvillus,
Salvinus,
Sanctinus,
Sanctus, 
Sandilianus, 
Sanga, 
Sarimarcus,
Saserna,
Satullus,
Saturnalis,
Saturninus, 
Saunio,
Saverrio, 
Saxo,
Scaeva,
Scaevola, 
Scapula, 
Scaro, 
Scarpus,
Scato, 
Scaurus, 
Schlerus, 
Scipio, 
Scribonianus, 
Scrofa, 
Sebastianus, 
Secundianus,
Secundillus,
Secundinus,
Secundus,
Securus, 
Sedatus,
Sedulus,
Segestes, 
Seianus, 
Sempronianus, 
Senator,
Seneca, 
Senecianus, 
Senecio,
Senilianus, 
Senilis, 
Senna, 
Senopianus, 
Septimianus, 
Septimillus,
Septimus,
Serapion,
Serenus,
Sergianus,
Sergillus,
Seronatus, 
Serranus, 
Sertorianus,
Servanus, 
Servatius, 
Servilianus,
Sestianus,
Sestinus,
Severlinus, 
Severianus,
Severillus,
Severinus,
Severus, 
Seuso, 
Sextianus,
Sextilianus,
Sextillianus,
Sextillus,
Sextinus,
Sextus,
Siculus,
Sidonius,
Sigilis, 
Silanus, 
Silianus, 
Silo, 
Silus, 
Silvanus, 
Silvester,
Silvianus,
Silvillus,
Silvinus,
Silvia,
Silvius,
Similis, 
Simo, 
Simplex, 
Simplicianus, 
Simplicius,
Siricius,
Siricus, 
Sisenna, 
Sisinnius, 
Sita, 
Solinus,
Sollemnis, 
Solon,
Solus,
Sophus,
Soranus,
Sorex,
Sorio,
Sospes,
Sotericus,
Sparsus,
Spartacus, 
Spectatillus,
Spectatus,
Spendius, 
Speratus,
Spinther,
Spurinna,
Squillus,
Statius, 
Stellio,
Stilo,
Stichus, 
Stolo,
Strabo, 
Structus,
Suavis,
Subulo,
Suburanus,
Successianus,
Successus,
Sudrenus, 
Sulca,
Sulinus, 
Sulla, 
Sulpicianus,
Super, 
Superbus, 
Superianus,
Superstes, 
Superus,
Sura, 
Surdus,
Surinus, 
Surius, 
Surus,
Symmachus, 
Symphorianus, 
Synistor, 
Synnodus,
Syriacus

T
Tacitianus,
Tacitus, 
Taenaris, 
Tancinus, 
Tanicus, 
Tantalus,
Tarcisius, 
Tarquinianus, 
Tatianus, 
Taurillus,
Taurinus, 
Taurus,
Tegula,
Telesinus, 
Tenax,
Terentianus,
Terentillus,
Tertianus,
Tertinus,
Tertiolus,
Tertius,
Tertullianus,
Tertullus, 
Tetricus, 
Tettianus,
Thrasea, 
Thurinus, 
Tiberianus,
Tiberillus, 
Tiberinus, 
Tibullus, 
Tiburs, 
Tiro,
Titianus, 
Titillus, 
Titinianus,
Titiolus,
Torquatus,
Toxotius,
Traianus, 
Trailus, 
Tranio, 
Tranquillinus,
Tranquillus, 
Trebellianus, 
Trebonianus,
Tremerus, 
Tremorinus, 
Tremulus,
Trenico, 
Triarius, 
Tricipitinus, 
Trifer, 
Trigeminus,
Trimalchio, 
Trinus,
Trio,
Trogus, 
Trypho,
Tubero,
Tubertus, 
Tubulus,
Tuccianus, 
Tuditanus, 
Tullianus,
Turbo, 
Turibius, 
Turpilianus, 
Turpilinus,
Turrinus,
Tuscillus,
Tuscus,
Tuticanus, 
Tutor

U
Ulpianus, 
Ulpiolus,
Umbrianus,
Umbrinus,
Ummidianus,
Urbanillus,
Urbanus,
Urbicus,
Urgulanianus,
Urgulanillus,
Ursianus,
Ursinianus,
Ursillus,
Ursinus,
Ursulus, 
Ursus, 
Uticensis

V
Vala, 
Valens, 
Valentianus,
Valentillus,
Valentinian, 
Valentinus, 
Valerianus, 
Valerillus,
Valgus (associated with Gens Quinctia), 
Varialus, 
Varianus,
Varro, 
Varus, 
Vatia, 
Vaticanus,
Vatinianus,
Vedrix, Velikov,
Vegetus,
Vejento,
Velocianus,
Velox,
Venantianus,
Venantius, 
Venator, 
Venter, 
Venustinus, 
Venustus,
Verax,
Verecundus, 
Vergilianus,
Verginianus,
Verinus, 
Verissimus,
Verres,
Verrucosus, 
Verullus, 
Verus, 
Vespa,
Vespasianus, 
Vespillo, 
Vestinus,
Vetranio, 
Vettianus,
Vettillus,
Vettonianus, 
Veturianus,
Vetus,
Viator, 
Vibennis, 
Vibianus, 
Vibidianus,
Vibillus,
Vibulanus,
Vicanus,
Victor,
Victorianus,
Victoricus, 
Victorinus, 
Victorius,
Victricius, 
Vigilantius,
Vincentius, 
Vindex,
Vindicianus, 
Vinicianus,
Vipsanianus, 
Virgilianus,
Virginianus,
Viridio, 
Virilis, 
Viscellinus,
Vitalianus,
Vitalinus, 
Vitalis, 
Vitellianus,
Vitulus, 
Vitus, 
Vivianus,
Vocula,
Volumnianus,
Volusianus, 
Volusus,
Vopiscus, 
Vulso

Z
Zeno, 
Zenodotus,
Zethos,
Zosimus,
Zoticus

See also
Roman Empire
Roman naming conventions
Naming conventions for women in ancient Rome
Roman Republic
List of Roman imperial victory titles
List of Roman nomina
List of Roman praenomina
Roman tribe

References

Names cognomina